Ray Edwards may refer to:

Ray K. Edwards (1923–1942), United States Marine Corps corporal who received a posthumous Silver Star
Ray Edwards (boxer) (1927–1991), Jamaican boxer
Ray Edwards (ice hockey) (born 1970), Canadian ice hockey coach
Ray Edwards (American football) (born 1985), American football defensive end 
USS Ray K. Edwards (APD-96), United States Navy high-speed transport, named after the marine

See also
Raymond Edwards (disambiguation)